Emma Johansson (born 7 October 1981) is a Swedish orienteering competitor.

She won a bronze medal in the middle distance at the 2015 World Orienteering Championships in Inverness.

References

External links
 
 

1981 births
Living people
People from Kristinehamn
People from Kristinehamn Municipality
Swedish orienteers
Female orienteers
Foot orienteers
World Orienteering Championships medalists
Sportspeople from Värmland County